Anis Hedidane (born November 9, 1986) is a Tunisian professional basketball player. He plays at the shooting guard position.

Pro career
Hedidane has played pro club basketball with Stade Nabeulien in the Tunisian Basketball League.

Tunisian national team
Hedidane is a member of the senior men's Tunisian national basketball team. He made his debut for the senior team as a 22-year-old at the 2009 FIBA Africa Championship. He saw action in eight of Tunisia's nine games, who earned the bronze medal, and its first ever trip to the FIBA World Championship.

References

1986 births
Living people
Tunisian men's basketball players
Stade Nabeulien basketball players
Shooting guards
21st-century Tunisian people